Peter Edward Fecci is an American neurosurgeon, professor and researcher. He is an Associate Professor of Neurosurgery, Pathology and Immunology at Duke University School of Medicine. He also serves as Director of the Duke Center for Brain and Spine Metastasis, Director of the Brain Tumor Immunotherapy Program, Residency Program Director, and Associate Deputy Director of the Preston Robert Tisch Brain Tumor Center at Duke.

Fecci's research centers around brain tumor immunology and immunotherapy, and T cell dysfunction in glioblastoma and other intracranial cancers. Some of his research has dealt with clinical trial design for primary and metastatic brain tumors, immunotherapeutic targeting of pituitary tumors, laser-induced interstitial thermal therapy (LITT), and novel nanotechnologies. He has published over 60 articles in scientific journals, and currently holds two active patents. In his practice as a neurosurgeon, he focuses on both primary and metastatic intracranial brain tumors.

Fecci received the Sontag Distinguished Scientist Award in 2015, the Prince Mahidol Youth Mentor Award from the Prince Mahidol Award Foundation in 2016, the Duke Health Scholars Award in 2016, and was a National Institutes of Health visiting scholar in 2017.

Education 
Fecci received his Bachelor of Science degree in Neurobiology and Behavior from Cornell University in 1999, followed by an M.D. and PhD from Duke University. His PhD thesis highlighted the role of regulatory T cells in restricting anti-tumor responses against glioblastoma.

Career 
After finishing his MD/PhD, Fecci started as an intern at Harvard Medical School’s Massachusetts General Hospital in 2007. He completed a Neurosurgical residency at Massachusetts General from 2008 to 2013. During his residency, he joined the Dana Farber Cancer Institute for a two-year post-doctoral fellowship.

In 2014, Fecci joined Duke University Medical Center as an Assistant Professor in Neurosurgery, and was promoted to Associate Professor in 2019. In 2014, he was appointed as the Director of the Brain Tumor Immunotherapy Program. He also became the Associate Program Director for Duke’s neurosurgical residency program in 2014 and assumed the role of Residency Program Director in 2019. He serves as the Director of the Third Year Medical Student Research Program in Neurosciences since 2015.

In 2017, Fecci founded the Duke Center for Brain and Spine Metastasis and continues to serve as the Director of this Center.

Research and work 
Fecci has curated a body of research focused on brain tumor immunology and immunotherapy. In this area, he wrote his first article in 2002 describing clinical immunotherapies for brain tumors. Towards the mid 2000s, his research began focusing on T cell dysfunction in brain tumor patients. In 2006, he published a paper entitled "Increased Regulatory T-cell Fraction Amidst a Diminished CD4 Compartment Explains Cellular Immune Defects in Patients with Malignant Glioma", in Cancer Research. He went on to publish multiple papers highlighting the role of regulatory T cells in restricting immunity and immune-based therapies for patients with brain tumors.

Fecci has also contributed a body of work aimed at understanding the role of immune checkpoints in mediating tumor immune escape in a variety of cancers. He was the first to explore immune checkpoint blockade as an immunotherapeutic strategy in brain tumor models: “Systemic blockade of CTLA-4 ameliorates glioma-induced changes to the CD4 T-cell compartment without affecting regulatory T-cell function” was published in Clinical Cancer Research in 2007. This was followed by a paper in 2012 exploring checkpoint blockade in combination with a tumor vaccine platform.

In 2013, Fecci co-authored "Activation of the PD-1 pathway contributes to immune escape in EGFR-driven lung tumors". Fecci and his colleagues demonstrated that "autochthonous EGFR-driven lung tumors inhibit antitumor immunity by activating the PD-1/PD-L1 pathway to suppress T-cell function and increase levels of proinflammatory cytokines." Subsequently, Fecci conducted further research into the PD-1 / PD-L1 axis as an immunotherapy target in patients with cancer, co-authoring several subsequent papers on this topic in Nature Communications and Cancer Research.

Fecci's research has gone on to produce entirely novel immunologic findings in cancer, including a 2018 Nature Medicine paper describing bone marrow T cell sequestration, a phenomenon exclusively accompanying cancers harbored within the intracranial compartment. His group is also the first to clearly identify and characterize bona fide T cell exhaustion in glioblastoma, publishing these findings in Clinical Cancer Research in 2018. He has advocated for new approaches to categorizing and addressing T cell dysfunction in cancer, a viewpoint advanced in his 2018 Clinical Cancer Research review: "T cell dysfunction in glioblastoma: Applying a new framework."

Through his lab, Fecci has worked on integrating strategies for reversing cancer-induced T cell dysfunction with current immune-based platforms. Fecci's lab has also worked on designing immune-based treatment programs for patients with primary or metastatic intracranial tumors. Their research focuses on the limitations to immunotherapeutic success, more specifically on understanding and reversing T cell dysfunction in brain metastases and glioblastoma patients. In their earlier work, Fecci and his lab studied concerns for regulatory T cell-induced tolerance, with the focus shifting towards the study of T cell ignorance and exhaustion in the late 2010s. In the late 2010s, Fecci's research interests expanded to include attention to radiotherapy, stereotactic radiosurgery, radiation necrosis, and laser-induced interstitial thermal therapy (LITT) platforms.

Awards and honors 
1999 - Cornell-Diamant Pre-Medical Scholarship, Cornell University 
1999-2001 - Nanaline H. Duke Scholar, Duke University School of Medicine
2001 - Eugene A. Stead Scholar, Duke University School of Medicine  
2001-2007 - Medical Scientist Training Program Fellowship, National Institute of Health 
2007 - Neurosurgery Award 
2008 - Resident Teaching Award 
2013 - Preuss Award for Neuro-Oncologic Research, Congress of Neurological Surgeons
2013 - Matson Award for Best Basic Science Research, New England Neurosurgical Society
2015 - Sontag Distinguished Scientist Award, Sontag Foundation
2015 - Resident Advocate Award, Duke University Department of Neurosurgery
2015 - Alpha Omega Alpha honor society
2016 - Prince Mahidol Youth Mentor Award, Prince Mahidol Award Foundation
2016 - Duke Health Scholars Award, Duke University School of Medicine
2017 - Paper of the Year, American Association of Physicists in Medicine

Selected publications

Book chapters 
"Adoptive immunotherapy for treatment of glioblastoma." In: Glioblastoma Multiforme, Markert J, DeVita VT, Rosenberg SA, Editors. 2005, Jones and Bartlett Publishers: Sudbury, Mass. Chapter 13.
Fecci PE, Dranoff G. "The Current State of Cancer Vaccines for Solid Tumors: Striving to become Inflammatory and Intolerant." Applied Immunotherapy for Cancer. 2014, Wiley-Blackwell.
Choi BD, Fecci PE, Sampson JH. "Chapter 23: Immunobiology and Immune Therapy." In: Neuro-Oncology:  The Essentials 3rd Edition Section V. Systemic Therapy, Bernstein M and Berger MS, Editors. 2014, Thieme Publishers.
Fecci PE, Chen C, Baumeister S, Dranoff G. "Chapter 16: Cancer Immunotherapy." In Vaccine Design: Innovative Approaches and Novel Strategies 2nd Edition. 2015, Horizon Press.
Fecci PE, Riccione K, Dunn GP, Reap E, Vlahovic G, Congdon K, Sampson JH. "Chapter 5: Glioma Immunotherapy: Losing Tolerance for Brain Cancer." in: The Duke Glioma Handbook: Pathology, Diagnosis, and Management. 2016, Cambridge University Press.
Berry-Candelario J, Farber SH, Fecci PE. "Immune Complement of Patients with Brain Tumors." In: Translational Immunotherapy of Brain Tumors. Sampson JH (ed.), 2017, Academic Press (Elsevier, Inc).
Woroniecka K, Chongsathidkiet P, Elsamadicy A, Farber H, Cui X, Fecci PE. "Chapter 18: Flow Cytometric Identification of Tumor-Infiltrating Lymphocytes from Glioblastoma." In: Methods in Molecular Biology: Volume 1741. Placantonakis D (ed.), 2017, Springer.

Articles 
PE Fecci, DA Mitchell, JF Whitesides, W Xie, AH Friedman, GE Archer: Increased regulatory T-cell fraction amidst a diminished CD4 compartment explains cellular immune defects in patients with malignant glioma. Cancer research 66 (6), 3294–3302. (2006)
PE Fecci, AE Sweeney, PM Grossi, SK Nair, CA Learn, DA Mitchell, X Cui: Systemic anti-CD25 monoclonal antibody administration safely enhances immunity in murine glioma without eliminating regulatory T cells. Clinical Cancer Research 12 (14), 4294–4305. (2006)
PE Fecci, H Ochiai, DA Mitchell, PM Grossi, AE Sweeney, GE Archer: Systemic CTLA-4 blockade ameliorates glioma-induced changes to the CD4+ T cell compartment without affecting regulatory T-cell function. Clinical Cancer Research 13 (7), 2158–2167. (2007)
DA Mitchell, PE Fecci, JH Sampson: Immunotherapy of malignant brain tumors. Immunological reviews 222 (1), 70-100. (2008)
EA Akbay, S Koyama, J Carretero, A Altabef, JH Tchaicha: Activation of the PD-1 pathway contributes to immune escape in EGFR-driven lung tumors. Cancer discovery 3 (12), 1355–1363. (2013)
TA Cheema, H Wakimoto, PE Fecci, J Ning, T Kuroda, DS Jeyaretna: Multifaceted oncolytic virus therapy for glioblastoma in an immunocompetent cancer stem cell model. Proceedings of the National Academy of Sciences 110 (29), 12006–12011. (2013)
P Agarwalla, Z Barnard, P Fecci, G Dranoff, WT Curry Jr.: Sequential immunotherapy by vaccination with GM-CSF expressing glioma cells and CTLA-4 blockade effectively treats established murine intracranial tumors. Journal of immunotherapy (Hagerstown, Md.: 1997) 35 (5), 385. (2012)
PE Fecci, AB Heimberger, JH Sampson: Immunotherapy for primary brain tumors: no longer a matter of privilege. Clinical cancer research 20 (22), 5620–5629. (2014)
S Koyama, EA Akbay, YY Li, GS Herter-Sprie, KA Buczkowski: Adaptive resistance to therapeutic PD-1 blockade is associated with upregulation of alternative immune checkpoints. Nature communications 7, 10501. (2016)
S Koyama, EA Akbay, YY Li, AR Aref, F Skoulidis, GS Herter-Sprie: STK11/LKB1 deficiency promotes neutrophil recruitment and proinflammatory cytokine production to suppress T-cell activity in the lung tumor microenvironment. Cancer research 76 (5), 999–1008. (2016)
Woroniecka KI, Chongsathidkiet P, Rhodin KE, Kemeny HR, Dechant CA, Farber SH, Elsamadicy AA, Cui X, Koyama S, Jackson CC, Hansen LJ, Johanns TM, Sanchez-Perez L, Chandramohan V, Yu YA, Bigner DD, Giles AJ, Healy P, Dranoff G, Weinhold KJ, Dunn GP, Fecci PE. T Cell Exhaustion Signatures Vary with Tumor Type and are Severe in Gliobastoma. Clin Cancer Res. 24(17):4175-86. Sep 2018.
Woroniecka K, Rhodin K, Chongsathidkiet P, Keith K, Fecci PE. T cell dysfunction in glioblastoma: Applying a new framework. Clin Cancer Res. 24(16):3792-3802. Aug 2018.
Chongsathidkiet P*, Chen C*, Koyama S*, Loebel F, Cui X, Farber SH, Woroniecka K, Elsamadicy A, Sanchez-Perez L, Herndon J, Cheema T, Souders N, Coumans J, Nahed BV, Sampson JH, Gunn MD, Martuza RL, Dranoff G, Curry WT, Fecci PE. S1P1 loss mediates T-cell sequestration in bone marrow amidst glioblastoma. Nat Medicine. 24(9): 1459–68. Sep 2018.
Fecci PE, Champion CD, Hoj J, McKernan C, Goodwin CR, Kirkpatrick JP, Anders CK, Pendergast A, Sampson JH. The evolving modern management of brain metastasis. Clin Cancer Res. Epub ahead of print. June 2019. 
Lorrey SJ, Sancez-Perez L, Fecci PE. Rescuing imperfect antigens for immune-oncology. Nat Biotech. Epub ahead of print. Aug 2019.

References 

Living people
1977 births
Cornell University alumni
Duke University School of Medicine alumni